Susan Randall (born September 6, 1974) is an American racewalker. In 2017, she competed in the women's 50 kilometres walk event at the 2017 World Championships in Athletics held in London, United Kingdom.

References

External links 
 

Living people
1974 births
Place of birth missing (living people)
World Athletics Championships athletes for the United States
American female racewalkers
21st-century American women